Kakatiya Nagar is one of the largest and the oldest colonies of Neredmet in Secunderabad City in the Indian State of Telangana. It falls under Malkajgiri mandal of Medchal-Malkajgiri district. It is currently administered under Malkajgiri Circle of GHMC. Law and order of Kakatiya Nagar sub-region is under the purview of Neredmet Police Station.

Localities in Neredmet Kakatiya nagar
The colonies of the Kakatiya Nagar sub-region are as follows:

 West Kakatiya Nagar
 East Kakatiya Nagar
 Deendayal Nagar
 Radhakrishna Nagar Colony
 RKH Colony
 Amedhkar Nagar
 Samathanagar
 Vinobhanagar
 Gokul Nagar
 Hill Colony
 Shiva Sai Nagar
 Sainik Vihar
 JK colony ( Ancient Devathala Bavi Area)
 Parvati Nagar

Transportation
Kakatiya Nagar is well connected by TSRTC City Bus services with ECIL X Roads and Secunderabad Junction railway station. The bus stops in Kakatiya Nagar include:

 Neredmet Old Police station
 Kakatiya Nagar (West)
 Gowri Shankar Apartments (Kakatiya Nagar)
 Kakatiya Nagar
 Vinobha Nagar
 Samatha Nagar
 Sainikpuri X Road Bus Stop

Ramakistapuram Gate Railway Station is the nearest suburban railway station. Neredmet Railway Station is now under Construction as a part of MMTS Phase 2.

Schools, Hospitals and Religious places

Schools
Kairali Vidya Bhavan
Little Pearls High School
St Sai Grammar High School
Sri Nagendra High School, Deendayal Nagar
St Marks Grammar High School, Deendayal Nagar
Pasha Public School

Hospitals
Sriya Hospital
Sri Srinivasa Ayurvedic Hospital

Religious places
Sri Lakshmi Narasimha Swamy Temple, Kakatiya Nagar
Sri Vijaya Vinayaka Panchayat Devasthan, Deendayal Nagar
Saibaba Temple, Samathanagar 
CSI Church Neredmet
GCBC CHURCH
Amebadhkar Nagar Mosque

References

Neighbourhoods in Hyderabad, India
Cities and towns in Medchal–Malkajgiri district